The Athletics at the 2016 Summer Paralympics – Men's 800 metres T53 event at the 2016 Paralympic Games took place on 14–15 September 2016, at the Estádio Olímpico João Havelange.

Heats

Heat 1 
11:26 14 September 2016:

Heat 2 
11:34 14 September 2016:

Final 
19:01 15 September 2016:

Notes

Athletics at the 2016 Summer Paralympics
2016 in men's athletics